Series 2 of police drama Rush premiered on 16 July 2009 on Network Ten. The second installments episode order was increased to twenty-two episodes up on thirteen from the first series. The second series continued to follow the lives of two teams employed with the prestigious Tactical Response Unit in Victoria, Australia.

Series 2 introduces a new main character Shannon Henry, a police negotiator who replaces Senior Constable Grace Barry after her death.

Cast

Regular
 Rodger Corser as Senior Sergeant Lawson Blake
 Callan Mulvey as Sergeant Brendan "Josh" Joshua
 Jolene Anderson as Senior Constable Shannon Henry (from episode 1)
 Josef Ber as Sergeant Dominic "Dom" Wales
 Nicole da Silva as Constable Stella Dagostino
 Ashley Zukerman as Constable Michael Sandrelli
 Samuel Johnson as Intelligence Officer Leon Broznic
 Catherine McClements as Inspector Kerry Vincent

Special Guest Star
 Asher Keddie as Jacinta Burns
 Marny Kennedy as Amanda

Recurring
Paul Ireland as Boyd Kemper
 Nathaniel Dean as Andrew Kronin
 Kate Jenkinson as Nina Wise
Maia Thomas as Sandrine Wales
Zen Ledden as Brian Marshall
Rohan Nichol as Inspector David Napthorn
 Jacek Koman as Anton Buczek
 Adam Zwar as Marty Gero
Luke Arnold as Constable Elliot Ryan

Episodes 
{| class="wikitable plainrowheaders" style="width: 100%; margin-right: 0;"
|-
! style="background: #FFE7E1; color: #000;"| No. in series
! style="background: #FFE7E1; color: #000;"| No. in season
! style="background: #FFE7E1; color: #000;"| Title
! style="background: #FFE7E1; color: #000;"| 
! style="background: #FFE7E1; color: #000;"| Written by
! style="background: #FFE7E1; color: #000;"| Australian viewers(million)
! style="background: #FFE7E1; color: #000;"| Rank(weekly)
! style="background: #FFE7E1; color: #000;"| Original air date
|-

|}

DVD release
The first volume of the second series of Rush, containing the first 12 episode of the series was released on 3 December 2009. The second volume, containing the back half of the series was released 1 April 2010.

References

External links 
 
 
 

2009 Australian television seasons